Asunto terminado is a 1953 Argentinean film, directed by Kurt Land, written by Abel Santa Cruz.  The movie was based on the play by André-Paul Antoine, "Métier de femme"  and starred Juan Carlos Thorry and Malvina Pastorino. The movie was released on August 21, 1953.

Cast
 Juan Carlos Thorry
 Malvina Pastorino
 Alfredo Almanza
 Julián Bourges
 Alejandro Maximino
 Toti Muñoz
 Toti Muñz
 Nelly Prince
 Beatriz Taibo
 Aída Villadeamigo

References

External links
 

1953 films
Argentine black-and-white films
1950s Spanish-language films
Films directed by Kurt Land
1950s Argentine films